Robert Hunter Middleton (May 6, 1898 – August 3, 1985) was an American book designer, painter, and typeface designer. Born in Glasgow, Scotland he came to Chicago in 1908 where he studied at the School of the Art Institute. He joined the design department of the Ludlow Typograph Company in 1923 and served as director of the department of typeface design from 1933–71. In 1944 he began operating a private press, The Cherryburn Press. He died in Chicago.

Typefaces
All of these foundry types (except Andromaque) were cast by Ludlow Typograph

{{columns-list|colwidth=30em|
 Ludlow Black (1924), a knock-off of Cooper Black
 Swash letters for Robert Wiebking's Artcraft (1924)
 Cameo (1927)
 Delphian Open Title (1928)
 Many additions to Ernst F. Detterer's Eusebius series
 Eusebius Bold (1928)
 Eusebius Bold Italic (1928)
 Eusebius Open (1928)
 Eusebius Italic (1929)
 Garamond series
 Garamond Bold + Garamond Bold Italic (1929)
 Garamond Italic (1929)
 Stellar + Stellar Bold (1929)
 Bodoni series
 Bodoni Black (1930)
 Bodoni Black Italic (1930)
 Bodoni Modern (1936)
 Bodoni Modern Italic (1936)
 Bodoni Campanile (1936)
 Bodoni Campanile Italic (1942)
 Tempo series
 Tempo Light (1930)
 Tempo Medium (1930)
 Tempo Bold (1930)
 Tempo Heavy Inline (1930)
 Tempo Light Italic (1931)
 Tempo Heavy (1931)
 Tempo Heavy Condensed (1931)
 Tempo Bold Condensed (1931)
 Tempo Medium Condensed (1935)
 Tempo Bold Italic (1938)
 Tempo Heavy Condensed Italic (1941)
 Tempo Black (1942)
 Karnak series
 Karnak Medium (1931)
 Karnak Black (1934)
 Karnak Open (1935)
 Karnak Obelisk (1935)
 Karnak Intermediate (1937)
 Karnak Black Italic (1937)
 Karnak Intermediate Italic (1939)
 Karnak Black Condensed Italic (1942)
 Mayfair Cursive (1932)
 Umbra (1932)
 LaFayette (1932)
 Mandate (1934)
 Eden Light + Eden Bold (1934)
 Coronet series, also known as Ribbon 131
 Coronet Light (1937)
 Coronet Bold (1938)
 Radiant series
 Radiant Bold Extra-Condensed (1938)
 Radiant Medium (1939)
 Radiant Heavy (1939)
 Radiant Bold (1940)
 Radiant Condensed (1941)
 Stencil (1938)
 Samson (1940)
 Flair (1941)
 Condensed Gothic Outline (1953)
 Admiral Script (1953)
 Florentine Cursive (1956)
 Formal Script (1956)
 Wave (1962)
 Square Gothic (Ludlow)
 Cheltenham Cursive
 Middleton also added twenty faces to the Record Gothic type family for Ludlow between 1956 and 1961 including:
 Record Gothic Condensed Italic Record Gothic Extended + Italic Record Gothic Bold + Italic Record Gothic Bold Condensed Record Gothic Bold Extended + Italic Record Gothic Bold Extended Reverse Record Gothic Thinline condensed Record Gothic Heavy Condensed Record Gothic Light Medium-Extended Record Gothic Medium-Extended + Italic Record Gothic Bold Medium-Extended Record Gothic Heavy Medium-Extended Andromaque was a face begun by Victor Hammer and completed after his death by his friend Middleton in the early 1980s. It was privately cast by Paul H. Duensing.
}}
While cited as America's second most prolific (metal type era) type designer after Morris Fuller Benton, many of Middleton's fonts have never been digitised. This may be because many were display or script designs which dated after their time of greatest popularity.

References
Rollins, Carl Purlington American Type Designers and Their Work. in Print, V. 4, #1.
Jaspert, W. Pincus, W. Turner Berry and A.F. Johnson. The Encyclopedia of Type Faces. Blandford Press Lts.: 1953, 1983. .
 MacGrew, Mac, "American Metal Typefaces of the Twentieth Century," Oak Knoll Books, New Castle Delaware, 1993, .
Friedl, Ott, and Stein, Typography: an Encyclopedic Survey of Type Design and Techniques Throughout History. Black Dog & Levinthal Publishers: 1998. .

Further reading
 Bruce Beck, Robert Hunter Middleton, the man and his letters. Eight essays on his life and career'' Chicago, 1985.

External links
 Robert Hunter Middleton Papers at the Newberry Library
Robert H. Middleton letters at the Newberry Library

1898 births
1985 deaths
American printers
American typographers and type designers